Zoltán Molnár (born 4 November 1973 in Budapest) is a Hungarian football defender. During his career, Molnár has played for Újpest, BVSC, Dunaferr, Vasas, Paksi and Szolnoki MÁV FC. He currently plays for Veszprém.

External links

1973 births
Living people
Hungarian footballers
Újpest FC players
Budapesti VSC footballers
Dunaújváros FC players
Vasas SC players
Paksi FC players
Szolnoki MÁV FC footballers
Association football fullbacks
Footballers from Budapest